Groopman is a surname. Notable people with the surname include:

Jerome Groopman, American physician and writer
John Groopman, American cancer researcher

See also
Gropman